Coldingham Loch is a freshwater loch in the parish of Coldingham, in the Scottish Borders area of Scotland, in the former Berwickshire, between Coldingham Moor and St Abb's Head. The area is also used for pheasant shooting.

The Scottish Borders Council has described Coldingham Loch as "eutrophic open water, with high levels of plant nutrient, turbid water caused by high plankton levels; coarse fish generally dominant; in natural state supports high levels of biodiversity; often important wildfowl sites".

See also
List of places in the Scottish Borders
List of places in Scotland

References
 'Freshwater Biology', vol.17, issue3, pp. 419–428: A. E. BAILEY-WATTS: Coldingham Loch, S.E. Scotland. II. Phytoplankton succession and ecology in the year prior to mixer installation

External links
RCAHMS record of Coldingham Loch, or Biter's Craig
CANMORE/RCAHMS record of Coldingham Loch, Long cist
National Archives of Scotland: Parish of Coldingham
Scottish Borders Council: Standing Open Water Habitat Action Plan
British Listed Buildings: Coldingham Loch, Boat House, Coldingham
Geograph image: Coldingham Loch Panorama

Lochs of the Scottish Borders